Hammel, also spelled Hammell, is a surname, and may refer to:

 Barry Hammel (born 1946, Hammel), American botanist
 Brian Hammel (born 1953), American college basketball coach
 Connor Hammell (born 1996), English footballer
 David Hammel (1838–1928), American businessman and politician
 Eric M. Hammel (born 1946), military historian
 Heidi Hammel (born 1960), American astronomer
 Henry Hammel of the partnership Henry Hammel and Andrew H. Denker
 Henry A. Hammel (1840–1902), Union Army soldier and Medal of Honor recipient
 Howard Hammell (1896–1965), Canadian politician
 Jason Hammel, baseball pitcher
 Jason Hammel, drummer of the band Mates of State
 Jack Hammel, (born 1966) American Actor
 John Hammel (1940–1983), New Zealand cricketer
 Leif Hammel (born 1935), Danish racing cyclist
 Leon Hammel (born 1996), German footballer
 Leopold Hammel (1858–1929), American lawyer and politician
 Pavol Hammel (born 1948), Slovak musician
 Penny Hammel (born 1962), American golfer
 Richard Hammel, American politician
 Steven Hammell (born 1982), Scottish retired footballer
 Sue Hammell (born 1945), Canadian politician
 Timo Hammel (born 1987), German footballer
 Todd Hammel, Arena Football League quarterback
 William Henry Hammell (1845–1937), Canadian politician 
 William James Hammell (1881–1959), Canadian politician
 William A. Hammell, Chief of the Los Angeles Police Department (1904–1905)